David Ampofo (born 14 June 1961) is a Ghanaian journalist, communications expert and social entrepreneur. He is the founder and Chief Executive of Channel Two Communications, an advocacy communications firm based in Accra, Ghana, and the host of Time with David, Ghana's premier talkshow.

Early life and education 
Ampofo was born at Takoradi in the Western Region of Ghana, where he lived with his parents, four brothers and three sisters. He attended the Takoradi International School along with his older brother, Thomas Edward Ampofo and older sister, Patricia Sloley. In 1972, on completion of his Common Entrance exam, he began his secondary school education at St. John's School, Sekondi run by the Brothers of the Holy Cross from the USA. In 1982, he won a Ghana Government scholarship to pursue his university education in Cuba at the elite political leadership school Escuela Nico Lopez.  His decision to go to Cuba was influenced by Jerry Rawlings, with whom he had developed a close relationship. He graduated from there in 1986 with a first-class degree in Politics & Philosophy.

Career 
Ampofo began his journalism career at the Ghana Broadcasting Corporation in 1986. In 1987 he was named Best Television Reporter. In 1988 he was named Journalist of the Year. Between 1987 and 1992, he was the host of Searchlight, a prime-time news and current affairs programme, and had many remarkable interviews with several world leaders, including Nelson Mandela, Yasser Arafat, Kenneth Kaunda and Sam Nujoma. He was a Presidential Correspondent and travelled extensively with Jerry Rawlings. He was a correspondent for CNN's World Report and in 1990 the Columbia Journalism Review did a piece on outstanding foreign correspondents in which Ampofo was named. That same year, he won the Flagship Britannia award (now Chevening awards) to pursue a master's degree in journalism at the University of Wales. On completion in 1991, he spent three months as an intern with The CBS News channel in New York City. He continued with attachments at leading public affairs firms Hill and Knowlton and Walter Judds in the UK. He also interned with leading UK newspaper The Observer. In 1995 he was selected as Africa correspondent for M-Net's award-winning actuality programme Carte Blanche - a position that put him at the cutting edge of major events across the continent and in contact with global movers and shakers. In 2020 he was appointed as new CEO of Ghana Upstream Petroleum Chamber.

Channel Two Communications 
Ampofo left the Ghana Broadcasting Corporation in 1992 and founded Channel Two Communications. He launched the television show Time with David in 1995 and has conducted over 500 television interviews. He is a filmmaker and has produced over 200 promotional documentaries and investigative reports. He has also served as Public Affairs Counsel for notable organizations and personalities including former CEO of Ashanti Goldfields, Sam Jonah and Dr Papa Kwesi Nduom, a leading Ghanaian entrepreneur and Presidential candidate.

The editorial pieces produced by Channel Two Communications are as follows:

Time with David - talk show. Created in 1995, it is a series of interviews with politicians, influential businessmen and leading thinkers. Past guests include Ghanaian Vice President John Dramani Mahama and elder statesman K. B. Asante.
Special Report - a series of documentaries aimed at providing insight into the social challenges that Ghanaians confront.
Business Report - a series of documentaries that showcase the different challenges facing the business sector and provide insight into Ghana's business climate.

Family 
Ampofo is one of eight siblings. His father, Thomas Edward Ampofo, worked with the Forestry Department and retired as the Chief Inspector of Timber. Ampofo is married to Sylvia Dadzie and they have five children. He was also formerly married to journalist and newscaster, Abena Konadu Agyeman (formerly Ampofo, née Agyeman).

References

1961 births
Living people
Chief executives in the media industry
Alumni of the University of Wales
Ghanaian television journalists